The Iran Hockey Federation (IHF) is the national governing body for field hockey in Iran. It is affiliated to the International Hockey Federation (FIH). The headquarters of the federation are in Tehran.

The current IHF interim president is Dr Bahram Ghadimi and the Secretary is Dr. Behrouz Gordan.

See also
Iran men's national field hockey team

References

External links
  Iran Hockey Federation
Iran Hockey FIH

Iran
Hockey
Federation
Field hockey governing bodies in Asia